The International Wushu Federation (IWUF) is an international sport organization and is the governing body for wushu in all its forms worldwide. The IWUF is recognized by the International Olympic Committee (IOC), and is also a member of the ARISF, GAISF, FISU, IWGA, and the ISF.

Organization 
The main governing bodies of the IWUF are the President and the Executive Board, the Secretariat, the Congress which meets every two years, and various technical committees. The IWUF's headquarters are located in Lausanne, Switzerland and Beijing, China. The current president of IWUF is Mr. Zhongwen Gou of China (2019-present).

As of 2020, there are 155 national federations affiliated with the IWUF which are organized under the following continental federations:

 Wushu Federation of Asia
 European Wushu Federation
 Pan American Wushu Federation
 African Wushu Federation
 Oceania Wushu Kungfu Federation

History
On October 3, 1990 in Beijing during the 11th Asian Games, the IWUF was established after four years of development by a preparatory committee from the Chinese Wushu Association (CWA). Since 1991, the IWUF has held 15 World Wushu Championships and has helped over 100 federations (List of member federations External) around the globe to organize their own championships and national tournaments. The IWUF has also been in an active pursuit of olympic wushu after being fully recognized by the IOC in 2002. The IWUF fell short of having wushu becoming an Olympic sport in 2008, but the IOC allowed them to host an international wushu competition alongside the 2008 Summer Olympics, which was known as the 2008 Beijing Wushu Tournament. During the 2014 Summer Youth Olympics in Nanjing, Jiangsu, China, wushu was an official demonstration sport, and wushu will return to the Youth Olympics in 2026. The IWUF hoped for inclusion in the 2020 Olympics but wushu was shortlisted in 2013 and again in 2015. Despite this, wushu has been included in several multi-sport events such as the Asian Games, East Asian Youth Games, Southeast Asian Games, World Games, World Combat Games, and the Universiade.

The IWUF has redefined the definition of sport wushu, dividing it into two main disciplines: taolu (forms), and sanda (unarmed combat).

Competitions

Primary
 World Wushu Championships
 World Junior Wushu Championships
 World Kungfu Championships
 Sanda World Cup
 Taolu World Cup
 World Taijiquan Championships

Special/historical

 2008 Beijing Wushu Tournament
 2014 Nanjing Youth Wushu Tournament

See also 

 Association of IOC Recognised International Sports Federations

References

External links
IWUF Official Website

1990 establishments in China
Wushu
Wushu governing bodies
Kickboxing organizations
Chinese martial arts
Organisations based in Lausanne